Foghorn Leghorn is a cartoon rooster who appears in Looney Tunes and Merrie Melodies cartoons and films from Warner Bros. Animation. He was created by Robert McKimson, and starred in 29 cartoons from 1946 to 1964 in the golden age of American animation. All 29 of these cartoons were directed by McKimson.

Foghorn Leghorn's first appearance was in the 1946 Henery Hawk short Walky Talky Hawky. Foghorn's voice was created and originally performed by Mel Blanc and was later performed by Jeff Bergman, Joe Alaskey, Greg Burson, Frank Gorshin, Jeff Bennett, Bill Farmer, and Eric Bauza.

Inspiration
Foghorn Leghorn was directly inspired by the character of Senator Claghorn, a blustery Southern politician played by Kenny Delmar on Fred Allen's popular 1940s radio show. Foghorn adopted many of Claghorn's catchphrases, such as "I say..." and "That's a joke, son!" Delmar's inspiration for Claghorn was a Texas rancher who was fond of saying this.

According to Keith Scott, the character's voice was also patterned after a hard-of-hearing West Coast-only radio character from the 1930s, known simply as The Sheriff, on a radio program called Blue Monday Jamboree. The accent has similarities to that of another Mel Blanc voice: Yosemite Sam (a strictly Friz Freleng character); and even more similar to a proto-Sam character in Stage Door Cartoon.

Biography, characteristics and personality
Physically, Foghorn Leghorn is depicted as a very large rooster with a non-rhotic Southern accent; he is easily the tallest of all the regular Looney Tunes characters. He has a bombastic and somewhat unrefined personality, and shows a penchant for mischief. Aside from the Senator Claghorn reference, his first name "Foghorn" is indicative of his loudmouthed personality, while his surname "Leghorn" refers to a particular Italian breed of chicken. According to Raw! Raw! Rooster! Foghorn lives on a farm in "Cocamunga" California and had attended "Chicken Tech" University; his college roommate and rival Rhode Island Red is a practical joker and even more obnoxious than Foghorn himself.

Foghorn often fancied himself a mentor figure to the smaller and younger characters he encountered, particularly Henery Hawk, tossing off bits of self-styled sagacity interjected with phrases like "Pay attention, son", or "Look at me when I'm talkin' to ya, boy", both of which borrowed heavily from Senator Claghorn's vernacular. But this proves to be Foghorn's worst trait, as his loud and fast mouth and propensity for over-explanation eventually annoys his intended subjects so much that, completely fed up with him, they end up hitting him over the head with a blunt object, yelling "Ahhhhh, SHADDAP!" and leaving in a huff.

"Camptown Races"
Beginning with the 1949 cartoon Henhouse Henery, Foghorn would perform a verse from the Stephen Foster song "Camptown Races", softly humming the lyrics while loudly singing the refrain "Doo-Dahh! Doo-Dahh!", and ending the verse, again loudly, with "Ohh, Doo-Dahh Day!" He often hummed the song more than once in a given short, though in the 1950 cartoon The Leghorn Blows at Midnight, he hummed "Camptown" only at the beginning, but then hummed "Old MacDonald" in two later scenes. On occasion, he would also sing his own lyrics if they were related to what he was doing at the time. "Camptown Races" essentially became Foghorn's signature tune and one of the most widely familiar uses of the song in popular culture. The final theatrical film in which the "Camptown" is scored for Foghorn is Mother Was a Rooster (1962).

Rivalry with Barnyard Dawg

Many of Foghorn's cartoons involve his perennial prank war with Barnyard Dawg (who often addresses Foghorn as "Foggy"), though it is never revealed how or why their feud started in the first place. Foghorn is often the initial aggressor, but unlike most of the other Looney Tunes rivalries, Foghorn pranks Dawg out of sheer self-amusement and Dawg is usually the one with the winning hand in nearly every short they appear together, although both lost in Walky Talky Hawky, Of Rice and Hen, and Mother Was a Rooster, and Foghorn managed to have some victories over Dawg in the Looney Tunes comic books. But for all of Foghorn's pranks, Dawg is just as adept at retaliation.

Most of the Leghorn cartoons began the same: Foghorn, humming "Camptown Races" to himself and carrying a wooden plank, sneaks up on Dawg while he is sleeping, often facing into his doghouse with his back protruding out the entry hole. Foghorn then pulls Dawg up by his tail and uses the plank to give him a whacking on his rear (in nearly every cartoon Foghorn gives Dawg eight whacks), at which point the angered Dawg chases after Foghorn barking, but can only go as far as the rope to which he is tied, which either yanks him back or stops him. In the latter case, he keeps barking at Foghorn who tells him, "Aah-h, sha-daahhp!" or does something to Dawg to force him to stop.

Despite their feud, Foghorn and Dawg manage to get along in a few instances, usually joining forces to defeat somebody who caused problems for both of them (e.g. Daffy Duck in The High and the Flighty or a fox in Fox-Terror).

In the 1958 short Feather Bluster the prank feud was passed down to Dawg's and Foghorn's respective grandsons, and the now-elderly Foghorn was puzzled as to why the little leghorn was behaving the way he was, but the elderly Dawg was only too happy to point out there's nothing wrong with him, except that "he takes after you."

"Foggy" and others
Other recurring themes throughout the cartoons included the attempts of the naive and diminutive Henery Hawk to catch and eat a chicken and Foghorn usually tricking him into believe that he is another animal and that Dawg is a chicken; and Foghorn's own efforts to woo the widowed hen Miss Prissy, often by babysitting her studious son, Egghead Jr. Foghorn was joined in a few episodes by a weasel called "Bill" who initially attempted to eat him but ended up joining forces to outwit the aforementioned canine.

Cartoon appearances
Shorts (1946–1964)
All of the 29 shorts from 1946 to 1964 were directed by Robert McKimson
 Walky Talky Hawky (1946)
 Crowing Pains (1947) – with Sylvester
 The Foghorn Leghorn (1948)
 Henhouse Henery (1949)
 The Leghorn Blows at Midnight (1950)
 A Fractured Leghorn (1950)
 Leghorn Swoggled (1951)
 Lovelorn Leghorn (1951)
 Sock-a-Doodle-Do (1952)
 The EGGcited Rooster (1952)
 Plop Goes the Weasel (1953)
 Of Rice and Hen (1953)
 Little Boy Boo (1954)
 Feather Dusted (1955)
 All Fowled Up (1955) 
 Weasel Stop (1956)
 The High and the Flighty (1956) – with Daffy Duck
 Raw! Raw! Rooster! (1956)
 Fox-Terror (1957)
 Feather Bluster (1958)
 Weasel While You Work (1958)
 A Broken Leghorn (1959)
 Crockett-Doodle-Do (1960)
 The Dixie Fryer (1960)
 Strangled Eggs (1961)
 The Slick Chick (1962)
 Mother Was a Rooster (1962)
 Banty Raids (1963)
 False Hare (1964) – with Bugs Bunny

Miscellaneous
 Daffy Duck and Porky Pig Meet the Groovie Goolies (1972) - voiced by Mel Blanc
 Bugs Bunny's Christmas Carol (1979) - voiced by Mel Blanc
 The Yolk's on You (1980) voiced by Mel Blanc
 Who Framed Roger Rabbit (1988) – voiced by Mel Blanc, (silent cameo appearance; voiced in a deleted scene)
 Superior Duck (cameo appearance) (1996) – voiced by Frank Gorshin
 Space Jam (1996) – voiced by Bill Farmer and Greg Burson
 Pullet Surprise (1997) – voiced by Frank Gorshin
 Tweety's High-Flying Adventure (2000) – voiced by Jeff Bennett
 Looney Tunes: Back in Action (2003) – voiced by Jeff Bennett
 Cock-A-Doodle Duel (2004) – voiced by Jeff Bennett
 GEICO commercial (2011) – voiced by Jeff Bennett
 Space Jam: A New Legacy (2021) – voiced by Eric Bauza
 Chip 'n Dale: Rescue Rangers (cameo appearance) – (2022)

Later appearances
In the third episode of the 1970 series Pat Paulsen's Half a Comedy Hour, Paulsen interviews Foghorn Leghorn, voiced by Mel Blanc.
 A carving of Foghorn Leghorn is seen as "Mount Foghorn" in The Bugs Bunny Mystery Special, a la Mount Rushmore.
 Foghorn made a cameo appearance in Who Framed Roger Rabbit (1988), during the final scene at Marvin Acme's factory along with several other various characters. He was also planned to deliver the sermon in the deleted "Acme’s Funeral" scene.
 Foghorn Leghorn made numerous appearances in Tiny Toon Adventures in numerous roles as Acme Looniversity's Professor of Hound Teasing, Baseball Coach and an obnoxiously loud Librarian, and also a mentor of Fowlmouth, voiced by Jeff Bergman in most episodes and Greg Burson in the episode "Buster and Babs Go Hawaiian"
 Foghorn Leghorn appeared in Taz-Mania, the episode "Gone with the Windbag" (1994).
 Foghorn Leghorn appeared in Animaniacs on "The Warner's 65th Anniversary Special", voiced again by Greg Burson.
 Foghorn Leghorn appeared in two Chuck Jones shorts of the 1990s, Superior Duck (1996) and Pullet Surprise (1997), voiced on both occasions by Frank Gorshin.
 Foghorn’s shadow appears as the radio announcer ordering General Pandemonium (Yosemite Sam) to get the secret german plans from Bugs Bunny in Carrotblanca
 Foghorn Leghorn appeared in the music video for Eminem's Role Model.
 A character named Mr. Leghorn, based on Foghorn himself, made a pair of appearances in Loonatics Unleashed voiced by Bill Farmer, and Rob Paulsen.
 A toddler version of Foghorn made appearances in short music videos of Baby Looney Tunes. He starred in only one episode of the show, in which he was trying to fit in with a gang of cool roosters and employed the help of Tweety and his friends before Lola Bunny suggested to just be himself, which came in handy when Barnyard Dog chased the cool roosters.
 Foghorn Leghorn is a croupier at Yosemite Sam's casino in Looney Tunes: Back in Action, voiced by Jeff Bennett.
 Foghorn appeared in commercials for Kentucky Fried Chicken, Oscar Mayer, and most recently, GEICO insurance.
 Foghorn Leghorn appears in The Looney Tunes Show, voiced by Jeff Bergman and his singing voice is provided by Damon Jones. In the series, he is represented as a billionaire and is one of a few characters to not be annoyed by Daffy Duck's antics.
 Foghorn Leghorn was a minor antagonist in Looney Tunes: Rabbits Run, voiced by Jeff Bergman. He is shown as a four-star U.S. general who is served by his intern Pete Puma, his spy Cecil Turtle, and his agent Elmer Fudd.
 Foghorn made a cameo appearance in the Wabbit episodes "Bugs vs. Snail", "Pork in the Road", "Squeaks Upon a Star", "'Tis the Seasoning", "Brothers in Harms". He has got the lead role in "Free Range Foghorn", "Fowl Me Once", "Fowl Me Twice", "Greenhouse Gasbag", "For the Love of Fraud", "Love Makes Me Daffy" "Victory Clasp", "You Ain't Nothing But a Foghorn", "Porky Pigskin", "Foghorn Foods" and "A Duck in the Laundromat", voiced again by Jeff Bergman.
 Foghorn officially made his debut in Looney Tunes Cartoons in the short "Weaselin' In!" while also making a cameo in the 2020 short "Happy Birthday Bugs Bunny!", voiced once again by Jeff Bergman.
 Foghorn Loghorn made a cameo appearance in Chip 'n Dale: Rescue Rangers on a frozen pasta box meal and his mentioned name “FOGHORN” in a label name in Sweet Pete’s Bootlegging facility.
 Foghorn Leghorn appears in Bugs Bunny Builders as the mayor of Looneyburg, voiced once again by Jeff Bergman.

Voice actors
 Mel Blanc (1946–1989)
 Gilbert Mack (Golden Records records, Bugs Bunny Songfest)
 Jeff Bergman (Tiny Toon Adventures, Tyson Foods commercial, The Plucky Duck Show, The 1st 13th Annual Fancy Anvil Awards Program Special...Live!...In Stereo!, Cartoon Network's Funniest Bloopers and Other Embarrassing Moments, Boomerang bumpers, The Looney Tunes Show, Looney Tunes Dash, Scooby Doo and Looney Tunes: Cartoon Universe, Looney Tunes: Rabbits Run, New Looney Tunes, Converse commercials, Looney Tunes Cartoons, Bugs Bunny Builders, Tiny Toons Looniversity)
 Noel Blanc (You Rang? answering machine messages)
 Greg Burson (Bugs Bunny's Birthday Ball, Looney Tunes River Ride, Tiny Toon Adventures, Taz-Mania, Animaniacs, Have Yourself a Looney Tunes Christmas, Carrotblanca, Space Jam (most lines), Bugs & Friends Sing Elvis, Bugs Bunny's Learning Adventures, Looney Tunes: What's Up Rock?!, various commercials and webtoons)
 Keith Scott (Looney Tunes Musical Revue, Spectacular Light and Sound Show Illuminanza, Toyota commercial, Golden Eggs commercial, KFC commercial, Kraft Foods commercial, Looney Tunes: We Got the Beat!, The Looney Tunes Radio Show, Looney Rock)
 Joe Alaskey (The Toonite Show Starring Bugs Bunny, You Don't Know Doc! ACME Wise-Guy Edition, Bah, Humduck! A Looney Tunes Christmas)
 Frank Gorshin (Superior Duck, Pullet Surprise)
 Bill Farmer (Space Jam (one line), The Looney Tunes Rockin' Road Show, Looney Tunes Racing, Looney Tunes: Space Race, Looney Tunes: Cartoon Conductor)
 Billy West (The Sylvester & Tweety Mysteries, Histeria!)
 Jeff Bennett (Tweety's High-Flying Adventure, Sprint commercial, Looney Tunes: Back in Action, Looney Tunes: Back in Action (video game), Cock-A-Doodle-Duel, A Looney Tunes Sing-A-Long Christmas, GEICO commercial, Ani-Mayhem)
 Scott McNeil (Baby Looney Tunes)
 Maurice LaMarche (Looney Tunes: Acme Arsenal)
 Seth MacFarlane (Family Guy)
 Damon Jones (singing voice in The Looney Tunes Show)
 Eric Bauza (Looney Tunes: World of Mayhem, Space Jam: A New Legacy)

In other media

Appeared in several Kentucky Fried Chicken commercials.

References

External links

Looney Tunes characters
Fictional chickens
Film characters introduced in 1946
Anthropomorphic birds
Male characters in animation